During the 1970s in Hong Kong, University had a heated political atmosphere, called the "hot era" of the Hong Kong student protests. 

At that period, university students (the Chinese University of Hong Kong and the University of Hong Kong) could be divided into three major factions according to their political stances: the Maoist faction, the social action faction, and the Trotskyists and anarchist faction. Many activists in those student protests later became key figures in Hong Kong's political, journalistic or cultural sectors.

Factions

Maoist faction

The Maoists, also called the "pro-China faction", initially retained their dominance in the universities and youth movements. In December 1971, the Hong Kong University Students' Union (HKUSU) organised its first visit into mainland China. In the next few years, the student activists undertook further tours into mainland China, ran Chinese study groups, and organised the so-called "Chinese Weeks", to carry out their mission of educating Hong Kong students about the achievements of China's socialist government.

In April 1976, the death of Premier Zhou Enlai triggered a large-scale demonstration at the Tiananmen Square in Beijing which was suppressed by the orthodox Gang of Four. The Maoist-dominated Hong Kong Federation of Students (HKFS) passed a resolution titled "Counterattack the Right-Deviationist Reversal-of-Verdicts Trend" on 3 May 1976, condemning the Tiananmen protesters as "anti-socialists" and "subversives".

However, the resolution faced stiff opposition from the Trotskyists, who issued a statement in a left-wing periodical titled October Review, condemning the Chinese Communist Party and calling for an uprising of the Chinese workers and peasants to topple the CCP's regime. By the end of 1976, the death of Mao Zedong which was followed by the arrest and downfall of the Gang of Four severely demoralised the Maoists in Hong Kong and damaged their formerly unshakeably idealistic belief in Marxist–Leninist socialism. The official verdict of the Tiananmen Incident was also reversed after Deng Xiaoping came to power in 1978, as it would later be officially hailed as a display of pro-Beijing patriotism, which further diminished the prestige of the Maoists, eventually wiping out their influence from Hong Kong's left-wing movements.

Social action faction

In the universities, the Maoist-dominated student unions faced challenges from the non-Maoist leftists, who were more critical of the Chinese Communist Party and criticised the blind-eyed ultranationalist sentiments of the Maoists. Instead, they focused more on the injustices in Hong Kong's colonial capitalist system and helped emancipate the indigent and underprivileged members of the community. The social action faction was influenced by the doctrines and ideals of the New Left, which was emerging in the West during the 1960s and 1970s, and was introduced to Hong Kong by Tsang Shu-ki, editor of the Socialist Review and Sensibility, two left-wing Hong Kong periodicals published in that time. The social action faction actively participated in the 1970s non-aligned social movements, such as the Chinese Language Movement, the anti-corruption movement, the "Defend the Diaoyu Islands" movement et al., in which many of the student leaders became the main figureheads and leaders of the contemporary pro-democracy camp.

The Yaumatei resettlement movement was one of the movements that attempted to pressure the colonial government into resettling the boat people located in the Yaumatei typhoon shelter into affordable public housing in 1971–72 and again in 1978–79. The social activists founded their own organisation with several Maryknolls and the staffs of the Hong Kong Christian Industrial Committee (HKCIC), which was called the Society for Community Organisation (SoCO) in 1971. Moreover, the social workers who felt constrained by the pro-government Hong Kong Social Workers' Association founded the Hong Kong Social Workers' General Union (HKSWGU) in 1980.

Trotskyists and anarchists

The Revolutionary Communist Party of China, which was founded in September 1948 by Chinese Trotskyists and led by Peng Shuzhi on the basis of the Communist League of China fled to Hong Kong after the Chinese Communist Party's takeover of China in 1949. The party has legally been active and has been publishing the October Review periodical in Hong Kong since 1974.

New Trotskyist and anarchist faction emerged from a student movement that broke out at the Chu Hai College in 1969. The students were disillusioned with the Communist Party in the aftermath of events such as the Cultural Revolution and the Lin Bao Incident, which heavily discredited the CCP.

In 1972, several members of Hong Kong's youth made an expensive trip to Paris to meet with exiled Chinese Trotskyists including Peng Shuzhi. Several of the returnees such as John Shum and Ng Chung-yin left the 70's Biweekly, which was at the time dominated by anarchists, and established a Trotskyist youth group called the Revolutionary International League, after meeting with Peng Shuzhi in Paris. It later took the name "Socialist League", and soon after changed its name into the Revolutionary Marxist League, which became the Chinese section of the Fourth International in 1975. Members of the group include Leung Kwok-hung, who formed the April Fifth Action after the league was disbanded in 1990, and Leung Yiu-chung of the Neighbourhood and Worker's Service Centre, who both became members of the Legislative Council in the 1990s and 2000s.

References 

1970s in Hong Kong
Student protests in Hong Kong
Hong Kong democracy movements